Alix (Alice) Talton (June 7, 1920 – April 7, 1992) was an American actress. 

A former Miss Georgia, from 1953-1955, Talton portrayed both Myrna Cobb and Myrna Shepard, next door neighbors in the television version of My Favorite Husband. 

She appeared in the films Ranger of Cherokee Strip, In a Lonely Place, The Great Jewel Robber, Fourteen Hours, Sally and Saint Anne, Tangier Incident, Rock Around the Clock, The Man Who Knew Too Much, Cha-Cha-Cha Boom!, The Deadly Mantis, Romanoff and Juliet and The Devil's Brigade, among others.

Talton was married to George Cahan.

She died of lung cancer on April 7, 1992, in Burbank, California, at age 71.

Partial filmography

Dive Bomber (1941) as Girl at Newsstand (uncredited)
International Squadron (1941) as Minor Role (uncredited)
Passage from Hong Kong (1941) as Tourist (uncredited)
You're in the Army Now (1941) as Navy Blues Sextette Member
The Man Who Came to Dinner (1942) as Chorine (uncredited)
Hers to Hold (1943) as Hazel (uncredited)
Ranger of Cherokee Strip (1949) as Mary Bluebird 
In a Lonely Place (1950) as Frances 'Fran' Randolph (uncredited)
The Great Jewel Robber (1950) as Brenda Hall
Fourteen Hours (1951) as Miss Kelly, Secretary (uncredited)
Sally and Saint Anne (1952) as Jeanne (uncredited)
Tangier Incident (1953) as Olga
The Story of Three Loves (1953) as Rose (segment "Equilibrium") (uncredited)
Rock Around the Clock (1956) as Corinne Talbot
The Man Who Knew Too Much (1956) as Helen Parnell
Cha-Cha-Cha Boom! (1956) as Debbie Farmer
The Deadly Mantis (1957) as Marge Blaine
Romanoff and Juliet (1961) as Beulah
 Carnival of Crime (1962) as Lynn Voray
The Devil's Brigade (1968) as Miss Arnold

References

External links
 

1920 births
1992 deaths
20th-century American actresses
American film actresses